Matilainen is a Finnish surname. Notable people with the surname include:

Kalle Matilainen (1899–1985), Finnish Olympic runner
Jukka Matilainen (1901–1967), Finnish Olympic runner, brother of Kalle Matilainen
Martti Matilainen (1907–1993), Finnish Olympic runner, brother of Kalle Matilainen

Finnish-language surnames